Brad King may refer to:

 Brad King (politician) (born 1956), Democratic member of the Utah State House of Representatives
 Brad King (actor) (1917–1991), American actor
 Brad King (alpine skier) (born 1966), Canadian alpine skier
 Brad King (Hollyoaks), a fictional character

See also
Bradley King (disambiguation)